The Boys' 200 metres at the 2011 World Youth Championships in Athletics was held at the Stadium Nord Lille Métropole on 8, 9 and 10 July. The event was won by Stephen Newbold of The Bahamas. Arman Hall, who ran the 2011 world youth leading over 200 metres, was switched to the 400 metres before the championship.

Medalists

Records
Prior to the competition, the following records were as follows.

No new records were set during the competition.

Final

References 

2011 World Youth Championships in Athletics